Ruyi Island is an under-construction artificial island approximately  northeast of Haidian Island, Haikou, Hainan, China.

The island

The bridge
The Ruyi Island Bridge connecting the island to the Hainan mainland will be 5.666 km long and 27.5 metres wide. The bridge will have a road and tramway, and will also be used to bring water, electricity, natural gas, and fiber optical cable to the island. It is expected to be completed around June 2019.

The staging port

On Hainan's mainland, on the east side of the mouth of the Nandu River, a port has been built to store caissons for the bridge. Barges then transport and place the caissons.

By the beginning of May, 2017, of the 553 caissons required, 460 had been prefabricated and 400 had been installed. The caissons weigh between 500 and 1,700 tons each.

See also
 List of islands of Hainan

References

Islands of Hainan
Haikou